Edilberto Oropesa (born November 23, 1971), is a Cuban former professional baseball pitcher, who played in Major League Baseball (MLB) for the Philadelphia Phillies, Arizona Diamondbacks (–), and San Diego Padres. On April 8, 2004, he was credited with the win, in the first-ever big league game played at Petco Park, as the Padres defeated the San Francisco Giants, 4 to 3.

In , he was hired by the Los Angeles Dodgers to work with their newly signed Cuban player, Yasiel Puig.

Personal life 
Oropesa is a father of three. He has a son named Eddie, who is 26, a daughter named Jessica, who is 21, and another son named Kenny, 18. He is married and resides in Miami, Florida.

Salary
Oropesa is estimated to have earned $1.15 million total in 3 of the 4 major league seasons he appeared in (2001, 2002, and 2004).

Pitching Style
Eddie Oropesa threw three pitches, a fastball, slider and changeup. Oropesa's pitching delivery was unique. Against right-handed hitters, he went from the full windup. He would hide the ball by turning his back to the hitter utilizing a high leg kick and release the ball from a high three-quarters arm angle. Against lefties, he would work exclusively from the stretch, even with no runners on base. Against lefties, he would turn his back slightly however his leg kick was not nearly as exaggerated and he would use a sidearm release point. This delivery made it really tough for lefties to hit him, as they only hit .242 against him in his entire career. However, these inconsistent mechanics often led to control problems.

See also

List of baseball players who defected from Cuba

References

External links

1971 births
Living people
Major League Baseball pitchers
Philadelphia Phillies players
Arizona Diamondbacks players
San Diego Padres players
Major League Baseball players from Cuba
Cuban expatriate baseball players in the United States
St. Paul Saints players
Vero Beach Dodgers players
San Bernardino Spirit players
San Antonio Missions players
San Bernardino Stampede players
Shreveport Captains players
Broncos de Reynosa players
Fresno Grizzlies players
Bakersfield Blaze players
Scranton/Wilkes-Barre Red Barons players
Clearwater Phillies players
Tucson Sidewinders players
Portland Beavers players
Iowa Cubs players
Olmecas de Tabasco players
Ottawa Lynx players
Joliet JackHammers players
Defecting Cuban baseball players
Minor league baseball coaches
Cuban expatriate baseball players in Canada
Cuban expatriate baseball players in Taiwan
Cuban expatriate baseball players in Mexico
Expatriate baseball players in the Netherlands
Sparta-Feyenoord players
Uni-President Lions players
Sportspeople from Matanzas